St. Luke's Hospital is a Massachusetts hospital located at 101 Page Street in New Bedford, Massachusetts.

History
The hospital was founded in 1884 by the Protestant Episcopal church with large financial contributions from Horatio Hathaway, a church leader who was one of the founders of Berkshire Hathaway.

In 1996 St. Luke's merged with Charlton Memorial in Fall River and Tobey Hospital in Wareham to form the Southcoast Health System.

In 2006, St. Luke's began building a new Emergency Department. Inside there are nineteen new private treatment bays. In 2008, The In-House Patient Pharmacy Department installed a Drug dispensing system throughout the floors called Pyxis Connect. While its operations continue in 2009 as the upgrade to the OR Rooms and Endoscopy Departments received new machines per room.

Services
St. Luke's has 293 beds in service and offers extensive in-patient medical and surgical services, with particular expertise in neurosurgery, cardiology, and general surgery.

Patients have access to advanced diagnostic testing, including computerized tomography scanning, MRI, and nuclear cardiology.

Rehabilitation services are available on-site.

Hospital rating data
The HealthGrades website contains the latest quality data for St. Luke's Hospital, as of 2015. For this rating section, two different types of data from HealthGrades are presented: quality ratings for thirty-two inpatient conditions and procedures and thirteen patient safety indicators. There is usually a percentage given by HealthGrades of percentage of patients that give very high ratings (9 and 10) but the data for this hospital is unavailable 

There are three possible ratings for in-patient conditions and procedures: worse than expected, as expected, better than expected.  For this hospital the data for this category is:
Worse than expected - 6
As expected - 21
Better than expected - 5
For patient safety indicators, there are the same three possible ratings. For this hospital safety indicators were rated as:
Worse than expected - 0
As expected -12
Better than expected - 1

References

External links
Southcoast Health System

Hospital buildings completed in 1884
Hospitals in Bristol County, Massachusetts
New Bedford, Massachusetts
Defunct hospitals in Massachusetts